The 2013 Karnataka Legislative Assembly election was held on 5 May 2013 to elect members from 223 constituencies in the Indian state of Karnataka. Five major political parties contested the election: Indian National Congress (INC), Bharatiya Janata Party (BJP), Janata Dal (Secular) (JD(S)), B. S. Yeddyurappa's Karnataka Janata Paksha (KJP) and B. Sriramulu's Badavara Shramikara Raitara Congress (BSRCP). Though Karnataka has 224 assembly constituencies, elections were held only for 223 seats. The election for the Piriyapatna constituency was postponed to 28 May 2013 due to the death of the BJP candidate for the seat. The voter turnout in the state was 70.23%.

The INC under the leadership of Siddaramaiah won the election with an absolute majority of 122 seats (including the Piriyapatna seat), 9 more than the majority mark of 113. As a result, the INC returned to power on its own after nine years with Siddaramaiah becoming the Chief Minister.

Background
In 2008, the BJP under the leadership of B. S. Yeddyurappa, won 110 seats, emerging as the single largest party. As the party did not have a majority of its own, having not won 113+ seats, it had to form a government with the support of a few independent MLA's. The BJP thus came to power for the first time in South India with Yeddyurappa becoming the Chief Minister of Karnataka.

However, the five years in which BJP was in power in Karnataka was not smooth and was mired in many controversies. A few months after coming to power, the BJP encouraged Congress and JD(S) MLA's to defect to the BJP to boost its strength in the assembly. Yeddyurappa had to face many revolts over his style of functioning from the Reddy brothers (Karunakara, Somashekara and Janardhana) and B. Sriramulu, a faction led by Balachandra Jarkiholi and the old BJP loyalists led by Ananth Kumar. Janardhana Reddy was arrested in the Bellary illegal mining scam in 2011. Some BJP leaders like Katta Subramanya Naidu, Ess Enn Krishnaiah Setty and Yeddyurappa were imprisoned for some time for their role in individual land scams. Yeddyurappa and Kumaraswamy of JD(S) were accused of encouraging illegal mining, though were cleared later by the High Court of Karnataka.

In its five years of rule, the BJP had three Chief Ministers. Yeddyurappa was forced to resign as Chief Minister in July 2011 due to his alleged involvement in a land scam. He was replaced by his handpicked successor and loyalist D. V. Sadananda Gowda, who faced a challenge from Jagadish Shettar, the Chief Minister choice for Yeddyurappa's opponents in the BJP. However, Gowda soon fell out with Yeddyurappa and the latter began to revolt against him, threatening to quit the BJP if Gowda was not removed. The BJP High Command replaced Gowda with Shettar, only 11 months after he became Chief Minister. Shettar was another Lingayat BJP leader whom Yeddyurappa opposed becoming his successor just less than a year ago as they were from the same caste.

In local body elections, the Congress and the JD(S) won more seats while the BJP was pushed to third. In the by-election to the Udupi Chimagalur Lok Sabha seat held in March 2012, the Congress won.

Yeddyurappa quit the BJP in November 2012 and formed his own party, the Karnataka Janata Paksha (KJP). Previously, Sriramulu had quit the BJP in 2011 to form the Badavara Shramikara Raitara Congress (BSR Congress) after Janardhana Reddy was imprisoned. These splits weakened the BJP.

Election 
The election was held in a single phase on 5 May 2013 for 223 out of total 224 seats. A voter turnout of 70.23% was recorded. 50,446 polling stations were set up for the 41.8 million voters in Karnataka. The election in the constituency of Periyapatna was adjourned due to the death of the BJP candidate, Sannamogegowda, a day before polls.

Results 

!colspan=10|
|-
! colspan="2" rowspan="2" width="150" |Parties and Coalitions
! colspan="3" | Popular vote
! colspan="4" |Seats
|-
! width="70" | Vote
! width="45" | %
! width ="50"| +/-
! Contested
! Won
!+/-
!%
|-
| 
|Indian National Congress
| 11,473,025
| 36.6
|  1.8
| 223
| 122
|  43
| 54.46 
|-
| 
|Janata Dal (Secular)
| 6,329,158
| 20.2
|  1.1
| 222
| 40
|  12
| 17.86 
|-
| 
|Bharatiya Janata Party
| 6,236,227
| 19.9
|  13.9
| 222
| 40
|  72
| 17.86 
|-
| 
|Karnataka Janata Paksha
| 3,069,207
| 9.8
|  9.8
| 204
| 6
|  6
| 2.68 
|-
|Bgcolor=#00308F|
|Badavara Shramikara Raitara Congress
| 844,588
| 2.7
| 2.7
| 176
| 4
|  4
| 1.79 
|-
| 
|Samajwadi Party
| 105,948
| 0.3
|  0.6
| 27
| 1
|  1
| 0.45 
|-
|bgcolor=#DB7093|
|Karnataka Makkala Paksha
| 55867
| 0.2
|  0.2
| 7
| 1
|  1
| 0.44 
|-
|bgcolor=#ADE879|
|Sarvodaya Karnataka Paksha
| 109,039
| 0.4
|  0.1
| 6
| 1
|  1
| 0.44
|-
| 
| style="text-align:left;" |Independents
| 2,313,386
| 7.4
|  0.5
| 1217
| 9
|  3
| 4.02  
|-
| colspan="2" style="text-align:left;" |Other parties and candidates
| 816,009
| 2.6
| 
|644
| 0
| 
| 0.0
|-
! colspan="9" |
|- style="font-weight:bold;"
| style="text-align:left;" colspan="2"| Total
|31,352,454 
| 100.00
| style="background-color:#E9E9E9"|
| 2948
| 224
| ±0
| 100.0
|-
! colspan="9" |
|- 
| colspan="2" style="text-align:left; |Valid votes
|31,352,454
|99.91
|
| colspan="4" rowspan="5" style="background-color:#E9E9E9" |
|-
| colspan="2" style="text-align:left; |Invalid votes
|28,682
|0.09
|
|-
| colspan="2" style="text-align:left; |Votes cast / turnout
|31,381,136
|71.83
|
|-
| colspan="2" style="text-align:left; |Abstentions
|12,304,603
|28.17
|
|-
| colspan="2" style="text-align:left; |Registered voters
|43,685,739
| colspan="2" style="background-color:#E9E9E9" |
|-
! colspan="9" |
|-
| colspan="9" style="text-align:left; |Source: Election Commission of India
|-
|}

Results by Constituency 
Source.

Notes

Aftermath
Following the defeat, Chief Minister Jagadish Shettar submitted his resignation on 8 May. Governor H. R. Bharadwaj later appointed INC legislative leader Siddaramaiah as the next chief minister. The next election was held in May 2018.

References

External links 
 

State Assembly elections in Karnataka
2010s in Karnataka
2013 State Assembly elections in India
14th Karnataka Legislative Assembly